Mentalism is a performing art in which its practitioners, known as mentalists, appear to demonstrate highly developed mental or intuitive abilities. Performances may appear to include hypnosis, telepathy, clairvoyance, divination, precognition, psychokinesis, mediumship, mind control, memory feats, deduction, and rapid mathematics. Mentalists perform a theatrical act that includes special effects that may appear to employ psychic or supernatural forces but that are actually achieved by "ordinary conjuring means", natural human abilities (i.e. reading body language, refined intuition, subliminal communication, emotional intelligence), and an in-depth understanding of key principles from human psychology or other behavioral sciences.

Mentalism is commonly classified as a subcategory of magic and, when performed by a stage magician, may also be referred to as mental magic. However, many professional mentalists today may generally distinguish themselves from magicians, insisting that their art form leverages a distinct skillset. Instead of doing "magic tricks", mentalists argue that they produce psychological experiences for the mind and imagination, and expand reality with explorations of psychology, suggestion, and influence. Mentalists are also often considered psychic entertainers, although that category also contains non-mentalist performers such as psychic readers and bizarrists.

Some well-known magicians, such as Penn & Teller, and James Randi, argue that a key differentiation between a mentalist and someone who purports to be an actual psychic is that the former is open about being a skilled artist or entertainer who accomplishes their feats through practice, study, and natural means, while the latter may claim to actually possess genuine supernatural, psychic, or extrasensory powers and, thus, operates unethically.

Renowned mentalist Joseph Dunninger, who also worked to debunk fraudulent mediums, captured this key sentiment when he explained his impressive abilities in the following way: "Any child of ten could do this – with forty years of experience." Like any performing art, mentalism requires years of dedication, extensive study, practice, and skill to perform well and perfect.

Background
Much of what modern mentalists perform in their acts can be traced back directly to "tests" of supernatural power that were carried out by mediums, spiritualists, and psychics in the 19th century. However, the history of mentalism goes back even further. Accounts of seers and oracles can be found in the Old Testament of the Bible and in works about ancient Greece. The mentalist act generally cited as one of the earliest on record in the modern era was performed by diplomat and pioneering sleight-of-hand magician Girolamo Scotto in 1572. The performance of mentalism may utilize conjuring principles including sleights, feints, misdirection, and other skills of street or stage magic. Nonetheless, modern mentalists also now increasingly incorporate insights from human psychology and behavioral sciences to produce unexplainable experiences and effects for their audiences.

Performance approaches
Styles of mentalist presentation can vary greatly. In this vein, Penn & Teller explain that "[m]entalism is a genre of magic that exists across a spectrum of morality." In the past, at times, some performers such Alexander and Uri Geller have promoted themselves as genuine psychics. Other famous mentalists, such as Joseph Dunninger and Michael Gutenplan, have claimed that their skills were human, but the result of extensive practice and study. The style of Theodore Annemann has been described as "that of an ordinary person, with extraordinary powers."

Some contemporary performers, such as Derren Brown, attribute their results and effects to natural skills, including the ability to master magic techniques and showmanship, read body language, and influence audiences with psychological principles, such as suggestion. In this vein, Brown explains that he presents and stages "psychological experiments" through his performances. Mentalist and psychic entertainer Banachek also rejects that he possesses any supernatural or actual psychic powers, having worked with the James Randi Educational Foundation for many years to investigate and debunk fake psychics. Thus, he is also clear with the public that the effects and experiences he creates through his stage performance are the result of his highly developed performance skills and magic techniques, combined with psychological principles and tactics.

Max Maven often presents his performances as creating interactive mysteries and explorations of the mysterious dimensions of the human mind. He is described as a "mentalist and master magician" as well as a "mystery theorist." In recent years, many other mentalists and allied performers also have begun to promote themselves as "mystery entertainers," as well.

Others, including Maurice Fogel, Kreskin, Chan Canasta, and David Berglas, may make no specific claims about how effects are achieved and may leave it up to the audience to decide, creating what has been described as "a wonderful sense of ambiguity about whether they possess true psychic ability or not."

Contemporary mentalists often take their shows onto the streets and perform tricks to a live, unsuspecting audience. They do this by approaching random members of the public and ask to demonstrate so-called supernatural powers. However, some performers such as Derren Brown who often adopt this method of performance tell their audience before the trick starts that everything they see is an illusion and that they are not really "having their mind read." This has been the cause of a lot of controversy in the sphere of magic as some mentalists want their audience to believe that this type of magic is "real" while others think that it is morally wrong to lie to a spectator.

Mentalist or magician?
Professional mentalists generally do not mix "standard" magic tricks with their mental feats. Doing so associates mentalism too closely with the theatrical trickery employed by stage magicians. Many mentalists claim not to be magicians at all, arguing that it is a different art form altogether. The argument is that mentalism invokes belief and imagination that, when presented properly, may allow the audience to interpret a given effect as "real" or may at least provide enough ambiguity that it is unclear whether it is actually possible to somehow achieve. This lack of certainty about the limits of what is real may lead individuals in an audience to reach different conclusions and beliefs about mentalist performers' claims – be they about their various so-called psychic abilities, photographic memory, being a "human calculator", power of suggestion, NLP, or other skills. In this way, mentalism may play on the senses and a spectator's perception or understanding of reality in a different way than conjuring techniques utilized in stage magic.

Magicians often ask the audience to suspend their disbelief, ignore natural laws, and allow their imagination to play with the various tricks they present. They admit that they are tricksters from the outset, and they know that the audience understands that everything is an illusion. Everyone knows that the magician cannot really achieve the impossible feats shown, such as sawing a person in half and putting them back together without injury, but that level of certainty does not generally exist among the mentalist's audience.

However, some magicians do still mix mentally-themed performance with magic illusions. For example, a mind-reading stunt might also involve the magical transposition of two different objects. Such hybrid feats of magic are often called mental magic by performers. Magicians who routinely mix magic with mental magic include David Copperfield, David Blaine, The Amazing Kreskin, and Dynamo. Notable mentalists who mix magic with mentalism include The Amazing Kreskin, Richard Osterlind, David Berglas, Derren Brown, and Joseph Dunninger.

Notable mentalists

 Alexander
 Theodore Annemann
 Banachek
 Keith Barry
 Guy Bavli
 David Berglas
 Paul Brook
 Derren Brown
 Akshay Laxman
 Chan Canasta
 Bob Cassidy
 The Clairvoyants
 Colin Cloud
 Corinda
 Joseph Dunninger
 Anna Eva Fay
 Glenn Falkenstein
 Maurice Fogel
 Uri Geller
 Haim Goldenberg
 Michael Gutenplan
 Wayne Hoffman
 Burling Hull
 Al Koran
 The Amazing Kreskin
 Nina Kulagina
 Max Maven
 Gerry McCambridge
 Alexander J. McIvor-Tyndall
 Wolf Messing
 Alain Nu
 Marc Paul
 Richard Osterlind
 The Piddingtons
 Oz Pearlman
 Princess Mysteria
 Marc Salem
 Joshua Seth
 Suhani Shah
 Nakul Shenoy
 Lior Suchard
 George Tait
 Rob Zabrecky
 The Zancigs

Historical figures 
Mentalism techniques have, on occasion, been allegedly used outside the entertainment industry to influence the actions of prominent people for personal and/or political gain. Famous examples of accused practitioners include:
 Erik Jan Hanussen, alleged to have influenced Adolf Hitler
 Grigori Rasputin, alleged to have influenced Tsaritsa Alexandra
 Wolf Messing, alleged to have influenced Joseph Stalin
 Count Alessandro di Cagliostro, accused of influencing members of the French aristocracy in the Affair of the Diamond Necklace
In Albert Einstein's preface to Upton Sinclair's 1930 book on telepathy, Mental Radio, he supported his friend's endeavor to test the abilities of purported psychics and skeptically suggested: "So if somehow the facts here set forth rest not upon telepathy, but upon some unconscious hypnotic influence from person to person, this also would be of high psychological interest." As such, Einstein here alluded to techniques of modern mentalism.

See also
 Cold reading
 Memory sport
 Mnemonist
 Scientific skepticism
 Thirteen Steps To Mentalism
 The Mentalist

References

Further reading

 H. J. Burlingame. (1891). Mind-Readers and Their Tricks. In Leaves from Conjurers' Scrap books: Or, Modern Magicians and Their Works. Chicago: Donohue, Henneberry & Co. pp. 108–127
 Derren Brown (2007). Tricks of the Mind. Transworld Press. United Kingdom.
 Steve Drury (2016). Beyond Knowledge. Drury. 
 Max Maven (1992). Max Maven's Book of Fortunetelling. Prentice Hall General; 1st edition. 
 William V. Rauscher. (2002). Mind Readers: Masters of Deception. Mystic Light Press.
 Barry H. Wiley. (2012). The Thought Reader Craze: Victorian Science at the Enchanted Boundary. McFarland. 

 
Magic (illusion)
Performance art